The Chief of the General Staff is the professional head of the Guyana Defence Force. He is responsible for the administration and the operational control of the Guyana military. The current Chief of Defence Staff is Brigadier Godfrey Bess.

List of officeholders

References

Chief of Defence Staff
Guyana
Chief of Defence Staff